Hickton is a surname. Notable people with the surname include:

 David J. Hickton (born 1955), public official
 Dawne Hickton (born 1957), American businesswoman
 John Hickton (born 1944), English footballer
 John Hickton (District Attorney) (died 2002), public official
 William Hickton (disambiguation), multiple people